De Magistris is a surname. Notable people with the surname include:
 Luigi De Magistris (cardinal) (1926-2022), Italian Roman Catholic archbishop
 Luigi de Magistris (politician) (born 1967), Italian politician and magistrate
 Gianni De Magistris (born 1950), retired Italian water polo player
 Pomponio de Magistris (died 1640),  Italian Roman Catholic Bishop  
 Simone de Magistris (died 1613), Italian painter and sculptor